Coraline is a dark fantasy horror children's novella by British author Neil Gaiman. Gaiman started writing Coraline in 1990, and it was published in 2002 by Bloomsbury and HarperCollins. It was awarded the 2003 Hugo Award for Best Novella, the 2003 Nebula Award for Best Novella, and the 2002 Bram Stoker Award for Best Work for Young Readers. The Guardian ranked Coraline #82 in its list of 100 Best Books of the 21st Century. It was adapted as a 2009 stop-motion animated film, directed by Henry Selick.

Plot

Coraline Jones and her workaholic parents move into a large, old house that has been divided into flats. In these flats, Coraline finds she has quirky new neighbors. These include Miss Spink and Miss Forcible, two elderly women retired from the stage, and Mr. Bobo, initially referred to as "the crazy old man upstairs", who claims to be training a jumping mouse circus. The flat next to Coraline however, is empty, and connected by a mysterious door that Coraline finds to be blocked by bricks when she asks her mother to open it.  

While adjusting to her new home, Coraline decides to visit these neighbors; they have some interesting things to warn her about. Mr. Bobo relays a message to Coraline from his mice: "Don't go through the door." And while having tea with Miss Spink and Miss Forcible, Miss Spink spies danger in Coraline's future after reading her tea leaves. Miss Spink also gives Coraline a curious adder stone.

One day, Coraline finds herself alone in the apartment; with curiosity eating her, she opens the door. This time she finds an oddly familiar corridor. On the other side of this corridor, she notices she is back in her apartment. It's as if she never left; everything in this apartment is almost the same as her own. She finds the residents of this "other apartment" to be her mother and father, but they now have buttons for eyes. The copy of Coraline's mother introduces herself as Coraline's "Other Mother" and the man as Coraline's "Other Father".

Coraline immediately realizes that this "Other World" is far more interesting than her own. Here, her "parents" pay attention to her, her new button-eyed neighbors Miss Spink and Miss Forcible perform wonderful shows on stage every night, and Mr. Bobo hosts a real amazing jumping mouse circus. She even finds a friend, a mysterious talking black cat that can travel between this world and the real world as he pleases; he is the only one without buttons for eyes.

One night, after Coraline returns to the copy of her flat, the Other Mother offers Coraline the opportunity to stay in the Other World permanently, but in order to do so, Coraline must allow buttons to be sewn over her eyes. Coraline is horrified and escapes through the door to her real home. Upon her return, Coraline finds that her real parents are missing. When they do not return the next day, the black cat wakes her and takes her to a mirror in her hallway, through which she can see her parents trapped inside. They signal to her by writing "Help Us" on the glass, from which Coraline deduces the Other Mother has kidnapped them. She first calls the police, but they do not believe her. Though frightened of returning, Coraline goes back to the Other World to confront the Other Mother and rescue her parents. Coraline is prompted by the cat to challenge the Other Mother: "Her kind of thing loves games and challenges." 

When Coraline finds the Other Mother, she is urged to stay but refuses. As a punishment, the Other Mother locks Coraline in a small space behind a mirror. In this small, dark space, she meets three ghost children. These children refer to the Other Mother as the "beldam"; each had in the past let her sew buttons over their eyes to stay in this world. They tell Coraline how the Beldam eventually grew bored with them, casting them aside and leaving them to die. They are now trapped because the Beldam has kept their souls. The children tell Coraline that if their souls can be rescued, they will be free. 

After the Beldam releases Coraline from behind the mirror, Coraline proposes a game. If she can find the essences of the ghost children's souls and her parents, then she, her parents, and the ghost children may all go free. If she fails, she will finally accept the Beldam's offer, let buttons be sewn into her eyes, and stay in the Other World forever. Coraline searches through the Other World and overcomes the Other Mother's obstacles by using her wits and Miss Spink's lucky adder stone to find the souls' essences. She also concludes that her parents are imprisoned in a snow globe on the mantelpiece. The ghost children warn her that even if Coraline succeeds, the Beldam will not let her go, so Coraline tricks the Other Mother by announcing that she knows where her parents are hidden: in the passageway between the dimensions. The Beldam cannot resist gloating by opening the door to show Coraline that her parents are not there. When the Beldam opens the door, Coraline throws the cat at her, grabs the snow globe, and escapes to the real world with the key, and the cat quickly follows. While escaping, Coraline forces the door shut on the Beldam's hand, severing it. Back in her home, Coraline falls asleep on a chair. She is awoken by her parents who don't have any memory of what happened to them.

That night, Coraline has a dream in which she meets the three ghost children at a picnic. The children are dressed in clothes from different time periods and one seems to have wings. They warn her that her task is still not done: the Beldam will seek revenge and will try to get the key to unlock the door. Coraline goes to an old well in the woods to dispose of the key. She pretends to have a picnic, with the picnic blanket laid over the entrance to the well. The Beldam's severed hand attempts to seize the key, but steps on the blanket and falls into the well. In the morning, Coraline returns to the house, greets her neighbors, and gets ready for school.

Characters
 Coraline Jones – Coraline is the 11 year old main character. She is a young explorer that is curious, intelligent, resourceful, and courageous. Coraline is often irritated by rain, crazy grown-ups (as they all seem to be), and not being taken seriously because of her young age. She's described as being "small for her age", but Coraline is not afraid to face anyone; she is the most adventurous person in the book. Coraline's actions throughout the book also show her compassionate side and her strong will.
 Mrs. Jones – Coraline's mother. She is very busy most of the time, and sometimes a little inattentive, but she loves and cares about Coraline. She is nice and helpful, though Coraline considers her to be rather boring.
 Mr. Jones – Coraline's father. He is usually found working at the house on his computer. He cares about Coraline very much and is kind, brave, and helpful. He makes "creative" food creations that Coraline strongly dislikes. He, too, is usually too busy to spend time with Coraline.
 The Cat – A black cat from the real world. The cat acts as a mentor to Coraline and guides her through her journey. He is left unnamed, as he explains that cats do not need names to tell each other apart, but the Other Mother refers to him as "Vermin". Unlike many of the characters in the novel, he does not have an "Other World" counterpart, he states that unlike other creatures in the world, cats can "keep themselves together". He moves freely from one world to the other, and appears to be capable of talking in the Other World. He possesses a very sarcastic personality, constantly belittling Coraline, but nevertheless is helpful to her. He is defiant of the Other Mother, but seems to tremble at the thought of being stuck in the Other World forever. He befriends Coraline and helps her escape from the Beldam, though Coraline also uses him as an impromptu weapon.
 The Beldam (also known as the Other Mother) – The primary antagonist of the novel. She is an evil inhuman witch and the ruler of the Other World. She looks similar to Coraline's real mother but taller and thinner, with long black hair that seems to move by itself, black button eyes, paper-white skin, and extremely long, twitchy fingers with long dark red nails. During the course of the novel, she grows taller, thinner, and paler, looking less and less like Coraline's mother. She cannot create, but only copy, twist, and change things from the real world when constructing her version of it. She collects children, whom she loves possessively to the point of eventual destruction, taking their souls so they cannot leave her world and caring for them until they pass away, but wanting to feel their happiness and joy afterwards. 
 The Other Father – A creation of the Beldam in the image of Mr. Jones, the Other Father is used to help trick Coraline to stay in the Other World. Like her real father, he has a study and sits there during the day and will not talk to Coraline for long. He does not work, he merely occupies the study, and is not permitted to talk to Coraline by himself. He is much more fun than Coraline's real father and always tries to be cheerful and fun in front of Coraline. In reality, the Other Father is sad and nervous. The Beldam ends up punishing him for revealing too much to Coraline—she transforms him into a soft, doughy, grub-like creature, and orders the Other Father to trap Coraline so she cannot win her challenge. He voices his reluctance to harm her, yet cannot refuse the Beldam's orders.
 Miss Spink and Miss Forcible – A pair of retired actresses who live in the flat under Coraline's. They own many aging Scotties and talk in theater jargon, often referencing their time as actresses. In the Other World, they are youthful and perform continuously in front of many different dogs, who, in the Other World, are anthropomorphic. 
 Mr. Bobo – A retired circus performer living in the flat above Coraline's; he is commonly referred to as the Crazy Old Man Upstairs. Over the course of the book, he claims to be training mice to perform in a mouse circus, and often brings Coraline messages from them. His Other World counterpart however, trains rats and is in fact made of rats. 
  The Ghost Children – The spirits of three children who were previous victims of the Beldam: two girls and one boy. The boy is described as having a dirty face and red trousers. One of the girls has brown hair, a pink blouse, and a pink skirt. The other has a brown bonnet and brown dress. They were trapped by the Beldam at different times before Coraline, and reside in the dark space behind the mirror. After having their souls restored, they go to the afterlife.

Adaptations

Television
Coraline inspired the "Coralisa" segment of The Simpsons episode "Treehouse of Horror XXVIII", which aired on 22 October 2017. Neil Gaiman provided the voice of the Simpsons' cat, Snowball V.

Film

With the help of the animation studio Laika, director Henry Selick released a stop motion film adaptation in 2009 that received critical acclaim. At the 82nd Academy Awards, the film was nominated for Best Animated Feature but lost to Pixar's Up. The film has several small differences, but holds strong to the original plot of the book. In the film, Coraline is depicted as having short blue hair and freckles. Henry Selick also added a new character, Wyborn "Wybie" Lovat, a boy about Coraline's age who vexes her at first but over time, grows on her. In the Other World, his copy cannot speak but is an ally to Coraline. At the end of the film, Coraline reaches out to help Wybie tell his grandmother what is behind the little door, whose sister was one of the ghost children lost to the Beldam.

Comic books
A comic book adaptation by P. Craig Russell, lettered by Todd Klein and coloured by Lovern Kindzierski, was published in 2008.

Musical

A theatrical adaptation, with music and lyrics by Stephin Merritt and book by David Greenspan, premiered on 6 May 2009, produced by MCC Theater and True Love Productions Off-Broadway at The Lucille Lortel Theatre. Nine-year-old Coraline was played by an adult, Jayne Houdyshell, and the Other Mother was played by David Greenspan.

Video games

A video game adaptation, based on the film, was published and developed by D3 Publisher of America. The game was released on 27 January 2009 for the PlayStation 2, Nintendo DS and Wii platforms and contains features such as playing as Coraline, interacting with other characters, and playing minigames. The game received mostly negative reviews.

Opera

An opera by Mark-Anthony Turnage, based on the novella, made its world premiere at the Barbican Centre in London on 27 March 2018.

See also
Coraline (given name)

References

External links
 Chapter One
 Audiobook page from publisher, with audio excerpt
 "The Other Mother" Guardian review by Philip Pullman
 Rudd, David "An Eye for an 'I': Neil Gaiman’s Coraline and the Question of Identity" Children’s Literature and Education 39(3), 2008, pp. 159–168
 The Lesson of Coraline – Business Week article about Polyjet Matrix in Coraline animation
 
 Coraline Blu-ray 2D & 3D disc review by Christian Hokenson

2002 British novels
Hugo Award for Best Novella winning works
British fantasy novels
Novels by Neil Gaiman
British novellas
Children's fantasy novels
Ghost novels
British Gothic novels
British horror novels
British children's novels
British novels adapted into films
2002 fantasy novels
Bloomsbury Publishing books
HarperCollins books
Nebula Award for Best Novella-winning works
2000s horror novels
Dark fantasy novels
Novels about parallel universes
2002 children's books
Weird fiction novels
Children's novellas
Witchcraft in written fiction
Talking animals in fiction
Bram Stoker Award for Best Work for Young Readers winners